State Route 173 (SR 173) is a primary state highway in the U.S. state of Virginia. The state highway runs  from Moyer Road in Newport News east to SR 629 in Dandy. SR 173 connects the Denbigh area of Newport News with Grafton, Seaford, and Dandy in eastern York County.

Route description

SR 173 begins at the intersection of Denbigh Boulevard and Moyer Road on the western edge of the Denbigh section of the independent city of Newport News. Denbigh Boulevard continues west to the Warwick River, where the highway ends at the Denbigh Park Boat Ramp within Denbigh Park. The state highway starts east through a residential area as a two-lane undivided road but expands to four lanes at Catalina Drive. At its intersection with U.S. Route 60 (US 60, Warwick Boulevard), SR 173 gains a center left-turn lane. The state highway crosses over CSX's Peninsula Subdivision and Interstate 64 with no access. SR 173 veers northeast and becomes a divided highway at its junction with SR 143 (Jefferson Avenue) west of Newport News/Williamsburg International Airport in the Oriana section of Newport News. At the boundary between the city of Newport News and York County, SR 173 reduces to a two-lane undivided road and its surroundings change from a suburban area to forest. After crossing the Poquoson River, the state highway intersects US 17 (George Washington Memorial Highway) in Grafton. SR 173 continues northeast as Goodwin Neck Road, which passes to the west of Seaford then curves east onto Goodwin Neck between Back Creek to the south and the Yorktown Refinery to the north. The state highway reaches its eastern terminus at SR 629 (Dandy Loop Road) in the community of Dandy on Goodwin Neck.

Major intersections

References

External links

Virginia Highways Project: VA 173

173
State Route 173
State Route 173